Martha Jane Coston (December 12, 1826 – July 9, 1904) was an American inventor and businesswoman who invented the Coston flare, a device for signaling at sea, and the owner of the Coston Manufacturing Company.

Early life
She was born Martha Hunt in Baltimore, Maryland, and moved to Philadelphia in the 1830s. At age 15 or 16, she eloped with Benjamin Franklin Coston, age 21, who had already acquired a reputation as a promising inventor. As a young man, he became director of the U.S. Navy’s scientific laboratory in Washington, D.C. At the Washington Navy Yard, he developed a signaling rocket and a percussion primer for cannons. He also experimented with color-coded night signals to allow communication between ships, which at that time was limited to visual signals such as flags during the day and lanterns at night. After a dispute over payment for his work on the percussion primer, Coston resigned his commission with the Navy in 1847 and became president of the Boston Gas Company. His work with chemical fumes at both the Navy Yard and the Boston Gas Company caused his health to deteriorate, and he died in 1848 as a result of the chemical exposure. His work on the signal flares, while important, was limited to plans and chemical formulas.

Flare design and business

The years following Benjamin Coston's death were filled with more tragedy for Martha Coston; two of her children and her mother died in the next two years, leaving her in poor condition emotionally as well as in difficult financial straits. While searching through her husband's papers, she discovered the notes he had written on night signaling at the Navy Yard. Her husband's incomplete work needed substantial additional effort before it could be turned into a practical signaling system.

For nearly ten years, Martha Coston worked to develop a system of flare signaling based on her husband's earlier work. With a limited knowledge of chemistry and pyrotechnics, she relied on the advice of hired chemists and fireworks experts, with mixed results.  A breakthrough came in 1858, while she was witnessing the fireworks display in New York City celebrating the completion of the transatlantic telegraph cable; she realized that her system needed a bright blue flare, along with the red and white she had already developed. she established the Coston Manufacturing Company to manufacture the signal flares, and entered into a business relationship with a pyrotechnics developer to provide the necessary blue color.

On April 5, 1859, she was granted U.S. Patent number 23,536 for a pyrotechnic night signal and code system. (The patent was granted to her as administratrix for her deceased husband, who is named as inventor.) Using different combinations of colors, it enabled ships to signal to one another, and to signal to shore. Captain C.S. McCauley of the U.S. Navy recommended the use of her flares to Secretary of the Navy Isaac Toucey in 1859. After extended testing, which demonstrated the effectiveness of the system, the U.S. Navy ordered an initial set of 300 flares, and later placed an order for $6000 worth of the flares.

International successes and the Civil War
Coston then obtained patents in England, France, Italy, Denmark, Sweden, and the Netherlands, and sailed to England to begin marketing her invention there and in other parts of Europe.  She remained in Europe until 1861, when she returned to the U.S. on the outbreak of the Civil War. She went directly to Washington, where she petitioned Congress to purchase the patent so that the flares could be used in the approaching conflict.  After some delay, Congress passed an act on August 5, 1861, authorizing the U.S. Navy to purchase the patent for $20,000, though less than the $40,000 she had originally demanded.

Coston flares were used extensively by the U.S. Navy during the Civil War; they proved particularly effective in the discovery and capture of Confederate blockade runners during the Union blockade of southern ports. Coston flares also played an important role in coordinating naval operations during the battle of Fort Fisher in North Carolina on January 13–15, 1865.

In 1871, Coston obtained a patent in her own name - Patent No. 115,935, Improvement in Pyrotechnic Night Signals. In addition to working on improvements to the signaling system, she continued to press claims for additional compensation from the U.S. government.  Due to wartime inflation, the Coston Manufacturing Company supplied flares to the U.S. Navy at less than cost, and Coston estimated that the government owed her $120,000 in compensation.  Although she pursued her claims for over ten years, she was offered only $15,000 additional reimbursement.

Use of the Coston flare in the United States Life-Saving Service
Eventually every station of the United States Life-Saving Service was equipped with Coston flares, which were used to signal ships, warn of dangerous coastal conditions, and summon surfmen and other rescuers to a wreck scene. Many accounts of wrecks and rescues describe the use of the Coston flare, which was instrumental in saving thousands of lives. While Martha Coston died in 1904, her company, later called the Coston Signal Company and the Coston Supply Company, remained in business until at least 1985.

Legacy

In 2006 Coston was inducted into the National Inventors Hall of Fame.

Coston and her husband are buried in Section D, Lot 62 in Laurel Hill Cemetery in Philadelphia.

References

Further reading
 Coston, Martha J. A Signal Success. The Life and Travels of Mrs. Martha J. Coston, Lippincott Co., Philadelphia, PA, 1886.
 Shanks, Ralph, and York, Wick, The United States Life-Saving Service, at pages 123–125, Costaño Books, Petaluma, CA 1996

External links
 Signal Corps Association, showing sample flare code signals, signal book and flare box (accessed January 19, 2008) Found in "Signal Success" is the Submarine page 11 bottom page. Wrighten by Martha J Coston 1886 and Lippincott Publishing co.
 A Woman With Flare, By C. KAY LARSON, New York Times, November 2, 2012

1826 births
1904 deaths
19th-century American businesswomen
19th-century American businesspeople
19th-century American inventors
American company founders
American women company founders
American patent holders
Burials at Laurel Hill Cemetery (Philadelphia)
Businesspeople from Baltimore
Businesspeople from Philadelphia
History of the United States Coast Guard
Women inventors